Mike dos Santos Nenatarvicius (born 8 March 1993), simply known as Mike, is a Brazilian footballer who plays as a forward for Gwangju FC.

Honours
Paulista
Copa Paulista: 2010, 2011

Internacional
Campeonato Gaúcho: 2012, 2013

Paysandu
Copa Verde: 2018

Atlético Goianiense
Campeonato Goiano: 2019

Chapecoense
Campeonato Brasileiro Série B: 2020

References

External links

1993 births
Living people
People from Suzano
Brazilian footballers
Association football forwards
Campeonato Brasileiro Série A players
Campeonato Brasileiro Série B players
K League 2 players
Paulista Futebol Clube players
Sport Club Internacional players
Botafogo Futebol Clube (SP) players
Sport Club do Recife players
Grêmio Osasco Audax Esporte Clube players
Oeste Futebol Clube players
América Futebol Clube (MG) players
Paysandu Sport Club players
Atlético Clube Goianiense players
Goiás Esporte Clube players
Associação Chapecoense de Futebol players
Gwangju FC players
Expatriate footballers in South Korea
Brazilian expatriate footballers
Brazilian expatriate sportspeople in South Korea
Footballers from São Paulo (state)